Tiffany Shepis (born September 11, 1979) is an American actress from New York City, who has been involved in film-making since the age of 16. She is popularly known as a "scream queen" in several horror films.

Career
Shepis got her start playing the part of Peter in James Gunn's first film Tromeo and Juliet. Shepis continued working in the genre she loved most, horror. Making several horror films a year, Shepis quickly became a fan favorite within the horror community in films such as Scarecrow, Syfy's Abominable the Sundance horror flick The Violent Kind and cult classic Beg. Shepis most recently was part of the record breaking Sharknado 2, the horror comedy The Night Watchmen, the anthology Tales of Halloween and also provided voice work for the Adult Swim TV show Robot Chicken.

Shepis married writer/director Sean Tretta in 2010. They have two children and currently reside in California.

Filmography

Film

Television

References

External links
 
 

American film actresses
1979 births
Actresses from New York City
Living people
21st-century American actresses
20th-century American actresses